Baringhup is a locality in central Victoria, Australia. Its most prominent geographical features are the Loddon River and the Cairn Curran Reservoir located on that river.

Baringhup has a general store (at the riverside caravan park) and a primary state school.

References

External links

Towns in Victoria (Australia)